Dorothy Vaughan (November 5, 1890 – March 15, 1955) was an American actress. She appeared in more than 143 films and television. Vaughan is best known for appearing in Slander House (1930), The Ape (1940) and Lady Gangster (1942). She was sometimes credited as Dorothy Vaughn.

Filmography

Film

Television

References

External links 

Rotten Tomatoes profile

1890 births
1995 deaths
People from Missouri
Actresses from Missouri
American film actresses
20th-century American actresses